Michael Layton (born November 26, 1980) is a Canadian politician who served on Toronto City Council from 2010 until 2022. Layton most recently represented Ward 11 University—Rosedale. He was first elected in the 2010 municipal election in Ward 19 Trinity—Spadina. Layton did not run for re-election in 2022.

Early life and education 

Michael Layton was born on November 16, 1980, to Jack Layton and his first wife Sally Halford, and is the step-son of Layton's second wife, former NDP Member of Parliament for Trinity—Spadina and city councillor Olivia Chow.

Layton has a Bachelor of Arts degree in political science and environmental management from the University of Toronto, where he was a member of the Kappa Sigma Fraternity, and a Master of Arts in environmental sciences from York University. After graduating, he worked for Environmental Defence, a national environmental charity eventually becoming deputy outreach director. He was also the coordinator for the Green Energy Act Alliance. He worked as a bartender and manager at a restaurant on King Street West for six years.

Political career 
In 2010, he ran as a candidate in Ward 19 to replace Joe Pantalone who retired to run for mayor. Layton won the election with more than double the vote total of his closest rival, Karen Sun.

In 2011, Layton opposed spending cuts by Mayor Rob Ford. He worked to preserve a women's shelter and a community pool in Stanley Park.

In 2011, Layton took issue with an advertisement for the Toronto Argonauts. Layton claimed that it condoned domestic violence. The football team subsequently replaced the advertisement.

Layton was a critic of plans to build a casino resort in downtown Toronto in 2012. His motion opposing the Ontario Lottery and Gaming Commissions casino expansion plans passed 40–4 in the Toronto City Council.

Working with residents in the Liberty Village neighbourhood in Toronto, Layton worked to try to get cheaper fares on the regional transit system GO Transit to improve public transit in downtown Toronto.

For the gold medal hockey game in the 2014 Winter Olympics, Layton gained passage of a motion to allow bars to open earlier to serve alcohol during the game.

In March 2019, Layton has put forward a motion, which was seconded by Mike Colle, to study the idea of suing oil companies over climate change.

Layton was highly critical of the clearing of the homeless encampment at Lamport Stadium in 2021, referring to it as "extremely disappointing and disturbing" and stating "There is something fundamentally wrong with the use of violence or the threat of violence in order to further criminalize homelessness in our city"

In July 2022, Layton announced he would not stand for re-election as ward 11 city councillor, citing family reasons.

Personal life 

Layton married his wife Brett Tryon, a program coordinator for the charity Environmental Defence Canada, on Toronto Island On August 26, 2012, near the location where Jack Layton and Olivia Chow were married in 1988.

He is the great-great-great-nephew of William Steeves, a Father of Confederation.

In the 2013 CBC Television film Jack, he is portrayed by Conrad Sweatman as an adult and Mitchell Kummen as a child.

Election results

References

External links 
 
 

1980 births
Mike Layton
Living people
People from North York
Toronto city councillors
University of Toronto alumni
York University alumni